James Davidson may refer to:

Politicians
James Davidson (Canadian politician) (1856–1913), mayor of Ottawa in 1901
James Davidson (Kentucky politician) (died 1860), Kentucky pioneer and politician
James Davidson (Oregon politician), member of the Oregon Territorial Legislature, 1851
James Davidson (British politician) (1927–2017), Member of the Parliament of the United Kingdom
James O. Davidson (1854–1922), governor of the U.S. state of Wisconsin, 1906–1911
James H. Davidson (1858–1918), U.S. representative from Wisconsin
James J. Davidson (1861–1897), American politician and businessman
James Ironside Davidson (1818–1902), Scottish-born farmer and political figure in Ontario, Canada

Sportspeople
James Davidson (American football) (born 1990), American football player
James Davidson (rugby union) (1868–1945), English rugby union international
 James Davidson (tennis) (born 1973), British tennis player

Others
James Davidson (historian) (born 1964), professor of Ancient Greek history
James Dale Davidson, founder of the National Taxpayers Union in the United States
James Duncan Davidson (born 1970), American software engineer
James Davidson (ornithologist) (1849–1925), ornithologist in India
James Alfred Davidson (1921–2004), British naval commander and diplomat
James Edward Davidson (1870–1930), Australian journalist and newspaper owner
James Davidson (antiquarian) (1793–1864), English local historian and bibliographer
James W. Davidson (1872–1933), explorer, writer, United States diplomat, businessman and philanthropist
James Wightman Davidson (1915–1973), New Zealand historian, constitutional adviser and university professor
James Wood Davidson (1829–1905), United States author
Norman Davidson (biochemist) (James Norman Davidson, 1911–1972), Scottish biochemist, molecular biologist and textbook author
James Davidson (Scottish architect) (1848–1923), Scottish architect
James Davidson (priest) (died 1933), Archdeacon of Bermuda
James Hutchinson Davidson (1902-1982), Australian bandleader commonly known as Jim Davidson

See also
James Davidson Geddes (died 1895), politician
Jim Davidson (disambiguation)
Jimmy Davidson (disambiguation)
James Davison (disambiguation)